The eleventh generation of the Ford F-Series is a line of light-duty trucks manufactured by Ford from the 2004 to 2008 model years.  Slotted between the Ford Ranger and the Ford (F-Series) Super Duty trucks, the model line includes the Ford F-150 pickup truck.  In a first (for several decades), both the body and chassis had undergone a redesign.       

Introducing a sharper-edged version of the aerodynamic styling from the tenth generation, this generation adopted several design elements from the larger Super Duty trucks, including the stepped front door windows (a design feature which remains in use), triple-bar grille (also shared with the Ranger), and optional extended-width mirrors.  

This generation of the F-150 was marketed by Lincoln-Mercury as the Lincoln Mark LT from 2005 to 2008 (replacing the Blackwood); again serving as the basis for Ford full-size SUVs, the F-150 shares a degree of mechanical commonality with the Ford Expedition and the Lincoln Navigator.   

Through its production, the eleventh-generation F-Series was assembled by Ford at multiple facilities in the United States, Canada, and Mexico.

Background
Designed by Tyler Blake under Patrick Schiavone between 1998 and January 2000, the styling was a revolutionary, more angular update of the PN-96. On August 29, 2000, the final production design was frozen. Development began in 1997, with scheduled production for September 2002 alongside the U222 Expedition. Development later ended in 2003 due to delays. 

The side windows changed to a Kenworth "Daylight Door" and Ford Super Duty-like appearance; dipping towards the front of the door. Most F-Series have two large "closed loop" front tow hook design (no hooks on some 4x2 models) as opposed to conventional open hooks.

Trim levels
XL - Included: Cloth upholstery, bench seat, 4.2 liter V6 engine, manual transmission, manual mirrors, manual windows, manual locks, 17" steel wheels, air conditioning, an AM/FM stereo with clock (on 2008 XL SuperCrew, an AM/FM stereo with a single CD player), black vinyl floor covering, tinted rear windows, front black fascia bumper, and black grille.
STX - Added: Body color bumpers, 17" cast aluminum alloy wheels, an AM/FM stereo with single-CD player and clock (and later, an auxiliary input jack in 2007, then MP3-capability in 2008), front seat center armrest and storage bin and cupholders, rear cupholders (SuperCab and SuperCrew), and a body color grille surround.
XLT - Added: Chrome front and rear step bumpers, black honeycomb grille, keyless entry, power mirrors, power accessory delay, color-coordinated carpet with floor mats, tachometer, speed control, power windows and locks with automatic driver's side window and autolock, compass and outside temperature display, 17" steel wheels (7-lug wheels on Heavy Duty Payload Package), overhead console, tinted rear windows with privacy glass, color co-ordinated steering wheel, and automatic headlamps.
FX4 - Added: 5.4L Triton V8 engine, FX4 off road decals, color-coordinated bumpers, 17" machined alloy wheels, black leather-wrapped steering wheel, black rubber off-road floor mats, limited-slip rear axle, skid plates, fog lamps, monotone body color bumpers, and off road shocks.
Lariat - Added: beige bumpers, two-tone paint, heated mirrors with turn signals, 18" alloy wheels, illuminated visor mirrors, automatic temperature control, rear window defroster, carpeted floor mats, an AM/FM radio with single CD and cassette player (2004 only), message center, color-coordinated leather-wrapped steering wheel with audio and climate controls, power driver's seat, leather-trimmed seats, and auto-dimming rear-view mirror.

Powertrain
Initially, only Ford's 4.6 L Triton 4R70E four-speed automatic transmissions or new 3-valve 5.4 L 3V Triton V8 engines with a 4R75E four-speed automatic transmissions were offered to the retail public on the new trucks. For the 2005 model year, Ford's 4.2 L Essex V6 and manual transmission became available and standard on base models after they were available only for fleet orders for 2004 and automatic headlamps became available. The 11th generation F-150 is the last vehicle Ford manufactured with a gasoline pushrod V6.

Updates and editions

2006
For the 2006 model year, a flex-fuel version of the 3-valve 5.4 L Triton V8 became available, and the SuperCrew model was made available with the 6.5' box. Also for the 2006 model year, an updated front bumper with circular fog lamps and a smaller bumper vent distinguished the 2006–2008 models from the 2004–2005 F-150. Other updates included improved front seats with more supportive side bolstering, and new 20" wheels available for FX4, Lariat and King Ranch. A navigation system became an option for the first time, being offered on the Lariat and King Ranch, as well as the all-new Harley Davidson trim. Not leaving the XLT unnoticed, Ford offered an XLT Chrome Package, also known as XTR in Canada, as well as a Lariat Chrome package. SIRIUS satellite radio became available on all trims except the XL. The FX4 became more upscale with a Luxury package, making it almost an alternative trim to the Lariat. A Harley-Davidson special edition was offered for 2006, being available in two- or all-wheel-drive, and only in SuperCab. Other mid-cycle refresh improvements included five-inch running boards, traction assist on 4x2 V8 models, and an all-new "Smokestone Clearcoat Metallic" paint on Lariat only.

2007
For 2007, Ford introduced a complement to the existing FX4 model, the new FX2 Sport package (a 2-wheel-drive truck with an appearance package). A SuperCrew was offered in the Harley-Davidson trim as well. Ford states that a properly equipped 2007 F-150 (Regular cab or SuperCab 8' box 4x2) can tow up to  maximum and 1800–3050 lb maximum payload.

2008
For 2008 a 60th anniversary package became available to celebrate 60 years of the Ford F-Series. This was also the last year for this generation.

S331
Saleen offers their own OEM version of the F-150, badged as the S331. Additionally, Roush offers an aftermarket version with similar power. Beginning with the second half of the 2007 model year, Ford offered the Saleen forced-induction package on the Harley edition as an OEM option.

F-150 Foose Edition
The F-150 Foose Edition debuted in fall 2007 as a 2008 model. Based on an F-150 FX2 Sport, it uses a Roush-developed powertrain.

Safety
The F-150 got top safety ratings (5 stars) from the U.S. National Highway Traffic Safety Administration (NHTSA) in frontal collisions, and not only got a "Good" rating from the Insurance Institute for Highway Safety's frontal offset test, but also a Best Pick. The dummy sensors recorded no injuries to any body region.

Awards, sales accomplishments 
The new F-150 earned the North American Truck of the Year award for 2004 and was Motor Trend magazine's Truck of the Year for 2004. It also beat the three-time winning Chevrolet Silverado for Car and Driver magazine's Best Pickup Truck for 2004 and 2005. The Ford F-Series has also earned the 2012 Motor Trend Truck of the Year. Additionally, over 939,000 F-Series trucks were sold in 2005, a single-year sales record for trucks.

As a popular fleet vehicle, this generation of the F-Series has garnered a number of awards from fleet management professionals. The 2006 F-150 was named Fleet Truck of the Year by Automotive Fleet and Business Fleet magazines, and the 2007 models of the F-150, F-250 and F-350 were chosen Best Fleet Value vehicles in their respective categories by automotive data-analysis firm Vincentric. Winner of the 2006–2007 Golden Icon Award (presented by Travolta Family Entertainment) for "Best Truck".

Gallery

References

11th generation
Pickup trucks
Rear-wheel-drive vehicles
All-wheel-drive vehicles
Motor vehicles manufactured in the United States
Cars introduced in 2003